This listing contains taxa of plants in the division Pteridophyta, recorded from South Africa. A pteridophyte is a vascular plant (with xylem and phloem) that disperses spores. Because pteridophytes produce neither flowers nor seeds, they are sometimes referred to as "cryptogams", meaning that their means of reproduction is hidden. Ferns, horsetails (often treated as ferns), and lycophytes (clubmosses, spikemosses, and quillworts) are all pteridophytes. However, they do not form a monophyletic group because ferns (and horsetails) are more closely related to seed plants than to lycophytes. "Pteridophyta" is thus no longer a widely accepted taxon, but the term pteridophyte remains in common parlance, as do pteridology and pteridologist as a science and its practitioner, respectively. Ferns and lycophytes share a life cycle and are often collectively treated or studied, for example by the International Association of Pteridologists and the Pteridophyte Phylogeny Group.

23,420 species of vascular plant have been recorded in South Africa, making it the sixth most species-rich country in the world and the most species-rich country on the African continent. Of these, 153 species are considered to be threatened. Nine biomes have been described in South Africa: Fynbos, Succulent Karoo, desert, Nama Karoo, grassland, savanna, Albany thickets, the Indian Ocean coastal belt, and forests.

The 2018 National Biodiversity Assessment plant checklist lists 35,130 taxa in the phyla Anthocerotophyta (hornworts (6)), Anthophyta (flowering plants(33534)), Bryophyta (mosses (685)), Cycadophyta (cycads (42)), Lycopodiophyta (Lycophytes(45)), Marchantiophyta (liverworts (376)), Pinophyta (conifers (33)), and Pteridophyta {cryptograms(408)).

Listing
Abrodictyum pseudorigidum Bauret & Dubuisson, indigenous
Acrostichum aureum L. indigenous
Actiniopteris dimorpha Pic.Serm. indigenous
Actiniopteris dimorpha Pic.Serm. subsp. dimorpha indigenous
Actiniopteris radiata (J.Konig ex Sw.) Link, indigenous
Adiantum aethiopicum L. indigenous
Adiantum capillus-veneris L. indigenous
Adiantum hispidulum Sw. indigenous
Adiantum hispidulum Sw. var. hispidulum indigenous
Adiantum incisum Forssk. indigenous
Adiantum lunulatum Burm.f. indigenous
Adiantum poiretii Wikstr. indigenous
Adiantum raddianum C.Presl
Alsophila capensis (L.f.) J.Sm. indigenous
Alsophila dregei (Kunze) R.M.Tryon, indigenous
Amauropelta bergiana (Schltdl.) Holttum, indigenous
Amauropelta bergiana (Schltdl.) Holttum var. bergiana, indigenous
Amauropelta knysnaensis (N.C.Anthony & Schelpe) Parris, endemic
Amauropelta oppositiformis (C.Chr.) Holttum, indigenous
Ampelopteris prolifera (Retz.) Copel. indigenous
Anemia dregeana Kunze, indigenous
Anemia simii Tardieu, indigenous
Anogramma leptophylla (L.) Link, indigenous
Arachniodes foliosa (C.Chr.) Schelpe
Arachniodes webbiana (A.Braun) Schelpe, indigenous
Arachniodes webbiana (A.Braun) Schelpe subsp. foliosa (C.Chr.) Gibby, Rasbach, Reichst., Widen & Via, indigenous
Arthropteris monocarpa (Cordem.) C.Chr. indigenous
Aspidium athamanticum Kunze, indigenous
Aspidium falcatum (L.f.) Sw.
Aspidium inaequale Schltdl. indigenous
Aspidium inaequale Schltdl. var. montanum Kunze, indigenous
Aspidium pentagonum (T.Moore) Kuhn, indigenous
Aspidium squamisetum (Hook.) Kuhn, indigenous
Asplenium adiantum-nigrum L. indigenous
Asplenium adiantum-nigrum L. var. adiantum-nigrum indigenous
Asplenium adiantum-nigrum L. var. solidum (Kunze) J.P.Roux, endemic
Asplenium aethiopicum (Burm.f.) Bech. indigenous
Asplenium aethiopicum (Burm.f.) Bech. subsp. dodecaploideum A.F.Braithw. indigenous
Asplenium aethiopicum (Burm.f.) Bech. subsp. filare (Forssk.) A.F.Braithw. indigenous
Asplenium aethiopicum (Burm.f.) Bech. subsp. tripinnatum (Baker) A.F.Braithw. indigenous
Asplenium anisophyllum Kunze, indigenous
Asplenium blastophorum Hieron. indigenous
Asplenium boltonii Hook. ex Brause & Hieron. indigenous
Asplenium capense (Kunze) Bir, Fraser-Jenk. & Lovis, indigenous
Asplenium christii Hieron. indigenous
Asplenium cordatum (Thunb.) Sw. indigenous
Asplenium dregeanum Kunze indigenous
Asplenium erectum Bory ex Willd. indigenous
Asplenium erectum Bory ex Willd. var. erectum, indigenous
Asplenium erectum Bory ex Willd. var. usambarense (Hieron.) Schelpe, indigenous
Asplenium friesiorum C.Chr. indigenous
Asplenium gemmiferum Schrad. indigenous
Asplenium hypomelas Kuhn, indigenous
Asplenium inaequilaterale Bory ex Willd. indigenous
Asplenium lividum Mett. ex Kuhn, indigenous
Asplenium lobatum Pappe & Rawson, indigenous
Asplenium lobatum Pappe & Rawson var. lobatum, indigenous
Asplenium lobatum Pappe & Rawson var. pseudo-abyssinicum N.C.Anthony & Schelpe, indigenous
Asplenium lunulatum Sw. indigenous
Asplenium monanthes L. indigenous
Asplenium multiforme Krasser, indigenous
Asplenium obscurum Blume, indigenous
Asplenium phillipsianum (Kummerle) Bir, Fraser-Jenk. & Lovis, indigenous
Asplenium platyneuron (L.) Britten, Sterns & Poggenb. indigenous
Asplenium preussii Hieron. ex Brause, indigenous
Asplenium prionitis Kunze, indigenous
Asplenium protensum Schrad. indigenous
Asplenium rutifolium (P.J.Bergius) Kunze, indigenous
Asplenium sandersonii Hook. indigenous
Asplenium schelpei A.F.Braithw. indigenous
Asplenium simii A.F.Braithw. & Schelpe, indigenous
Asplenium splendens Kunze, indigenous
Asplenium splendens Kunze subsp. drakensbergense A.F.Braithw. near endemic
Asplenium splendens Kunze subsp. splendens, indigenous
Asplenium stoloniferum Bory, indigenous
Asplenium theciferum (Humb., Bonpl. & Kunth) Mett. indigenous
Asplenium theciferum (Humb., Bonpl. & Kunth) Mett. var. concinnum (Schrad.) Schelpe, indigenous
Asplenium trichomanes L. indigenous
Asplenium trichomanes L. subsp. quadrivalens D.E.Mey. indigenous
Asplenium varians Wall. ex Hook. & Grev. indigenous
Asplenium varians Wall. ex Hook. & Grev. subsp. fimbriatum (Kunze) Schelpe, indigenous
Asplenium x flexuosum Schrad. indigenous
Athyrium crassicaule J.P.Roux, near endemic
Athyrium newtonii Baker, indigenous 
Athyrium schimperi Moug. ex Fee, indigenous
Azolla cristata Kaulf. invasive
Azolla filiculoides Lam. invasive
Azolla microphylla Kaulf.
Azolla pinnata R.Br. indigenous
Azolla pinnata R.Br. subsp. africana (Desv.) R.M.K.Saunders & K.Fowler, indigenous
Azolla pinnata R.Br. subsp. asiatica R.M.K.Saunders & K.Fowler, invasive
Blechnum attenuatum (Sw.) Mett. indigenous
Blechnum attenuatum (Sw.) Mett. var. giganteum (Kaulf.) Bonap.
Blechnum australe L. indigenous
Blechnum australe L. subsp. australe, indigenous
Blechnum capense Burm.f. indigenous
Blechnum inflexum (Kunze) Kuhn, indigenous
Blechnum punctulatum Sw. indigenous
Blechnum punctulatum Sw. var. atherstonei (Pappe & Rawson) Sim, indigenous
Blechnum punctulatum Sw. var. intermedium (Sim) Sim, endemic
Blechnum punctulatum Sw. var. krebsii (Kunze) Sim, endemic
Blechnum punctulatum Sw. var. punctulatum, indigenous
Blechnum tabulare (Thunb.) Kuhn, indigenous
Blotiella glabra (Bory) R.M.Tryon, indigenous
Blotiella natalensis (Hook.) R.M.Tryon, indigenous
Bolbitis heudelotii (Bory ex Fee) Alston, indigenous
Cephalomanes rigidum (Sw.) K.Iwats. indigenous
Ceratopteris thalictroides (L.) Brongn. indigenous
Ceterach cordatum (Thunb.) Desv. indigenous
Cheilanthes bergiana Schltdl. indigenous
Cheilanthes botswanae Schelpe & N.C.Anthony, indigenous
Cheilanthes buchananii (Baker) Domin, indigenous
Cheilanthes capensis (Thunb.) Sw. indigenous
Cheilanthes ceterachoides A.W.Klopper & Klopper, endemic
Cheilanthes contracta (Kunze) Mett. ex Kuhn, endemic
Cheilanthes deltoidea Kunze, indigenous
Cheilanthes deltoidea Kunze subsp. deltoidea, indigenous
Cheilanthes deltoidea Kunze subsp. silicicola Klopper & A.E.van Wyk, endemic
Cheilanthes depauperata Baker, endemic
Cheilanthes dolomiticola (Schelpe) Schelpe & N.C.Anthony, indigenous
Cheilanthes eckloniana (Kunze) Mett. indigenous
Cheilanthes hastata (L.f.) Kunze, indigenous
Cheilanthes hirta Sw.  indigenous
Cheilanthes hirta Sw. var. brevipilosa W.Jacobsen & N.Jacobsen forma brevipilosa, indigenous
Cheilanthes hirta Sw. var. brevipilosa W.Jacobsen & N.Jacobsen forma laxa, indigenous
Cheilanthes hirta Sw. var. brevipilosa W.Jacobsen & N.Jacobsen forma waterbergensis, endemic
Cheilanthes hirta Sw. var. hirta, indigenous
Cheilanthes hirta Sw. var. hyaloglandulosa (W.Jacobsen & N.Jacobsen) J.E.Burrows, indigenous
Cheilanthes hirta Sw. var. inferacampestris W.Jacobsen & N.Jacobsen, indigenous
Cheilanthes hirta Sw. var. nemorosa W.Jacobsen & N.Jacobsen, indigenous
Cheilanthes hyaloglandulosa W.Jacobsen & N.Jacobsen, indigenous
Cheilanthes inaequalis (Kunze) Mett. indigenous
Cheilanthes inaequalis (Kunze) Mett. var. buchananii (Baker) Schelpe, indigenous
Cheilanthes induta Kunze, endemic
Cheilanthes involuta (Sw.) Schelpe & N.C.Anthony, indigenous
Cheilanthes involuta (Sw.) Schelpe & N.C.Anthony var. involuta, indigenous
Cheilanthes involuta (Sw.) Schelpe & N.C.Anthony var. obscura (N.C.Anthony) N.C.Anthony, indigenous
Cheilanthes kunzei Mett. indigenous
Cheilanthes marlothii (Hieron.) Domin, indigenous
Cheilanthes multifida (Sw.) Sw. indigenous
Cheilanthes multifida (Sw.) Sw. subsp. lacerata N.C.Anthony & Schelpe, indigenous
Cheilanthes multifida (Sw.) Sw. var. multifida, indigenous
Cheilanthes namaquensis (Baker) Schelpe & N.C.Anthony, indigenous
Cheilanthes nielsii W.Jacobsen, indigenous
Cheilanthes parviloba (Sw.) Sw. indigenous
Cheilanthes pentagona Schelpe & N.C.Anthony, indigenous
Cheilanthes quadripinnata (Forssk.) Kuhn, indigenous
Cheilanthes rawsonii (Pappe) Mett. ex Kuhn, indigenous
Cheilanthes robusta (Kunze) R.M.Tryon, indigenous
Cheilanthes viridis (Forssk.) Sw. indigenous
Cheilanthes viridis (Forssk.) Sw. var. glauca (Sim) Schelpe & N.C.Anthony, indigenous
Cheilanthes viridis (Forssk.) Sw. var. macrophylla (Kunze) Schelpe & N.C.Anthony, indigenous
Cheilanthes viridis (Forssk.) Sw. var. viridis, indigenous
Christella altissima Holttum, endemic
Christella buchananii (Schelpe) J.P.Roux, indigenous
Christella chaseana (Schelpe) Holttum, indigenous
Christella dentata (Forssk.) Brownsey & Jermy, indigenous
Christella gueinziana (Mett.) Holttum, indigenous
Christella hispidula (Decne.) Holttum, indigenous
Crepidomanes borbonicum (Bosch) J.P.Roux, indigenous
Crepidomanes inopinatum (Pic.Serm.) J.P.Roux, indigenous
Crepidomanes melanotrichum (Schltdl.) J.P.Roux, indigenous
Ctenitis lanuginosa (Willd. ex Kaulf.) Copel. indigenous
Cyathea capensis (L.f.) Sm. indigenous
Cyathea cooperi (Hook. ex F.Muell.) Domin.
Cyathea dregei Kunze, indigenous
Cyclosorus guenzianus (Mett.) J.P.Roux, indigenous
Cyclosorus interruptus (Willd.) H.Ito, indigenous
Cyrtomium falcatum (L.f.) C.Presl
Cyrtomium luctuosum J.P.Roux, indigenous
Cyrtomium pseudocaryotideum J.P.Roux, endemic
Cystopteris fragilis (L.) Bernh. indigenous
Cystopteris fragilis (L.) Bernh. subsp. fragilis, indigenous
Davallia chaerophylloides (Poir.) Steud. indigenous
Davallia denticulata (Burm.f.) Mett. ex Kuhn, indigenous
Davallia denticulata (Burm.f.) Mett. ex Kuhn var. denticulata, indigenous
Deparia japonica (Thunb.) M.Kato, invasive
Dicksonia antarctica Labill. cultivated
Dicranopteris linearis (Burm.f.) Underw. indigenous
Dicranopteris linearis (Burm.f.) Underw. var. linearis, indigenous
Didymochlaena truncatula (Sw.) J.Sm. indigenous
Didymoglossum erosum (Willd.) Beentje, indigenous
Didymoglossum reptans (Sw.) C.Presl, indigenous
Diplazium esculentum (Retz.) Sw. invasive
Diplazium zanzibaricum (Baker) C.Chr. indigenous
Doodia caudata (Cav.) R.Br.
Doryopteris concolor (Langsd. & Fisch.) Kuhn, indigenous
Doryopteris pilosa (Poir.) Kuhn, indigenous
Doryopteris pilosa (Poir.) Kuhn var. gemmifera J.E.Burrows & S.E.Strauss, indigenous
Dryopteris antarctica (Baker) C.Chr. indigenous
Dryopteris athamantica (Kunze) Kuntze, indigenous
Dryopteris buchananii (Baker) Kuntze, indigenous
Dryopteris callolepis C.Chr. indigenous
Dryopteris dracomontana Schelpe & N.C.Anthony, indigenous
Dryopteris esterhuyseniae Schelpe & N.C.Anthony, endemic
Dryopteris falcata (L.f.) Kuntze
Dryopteris inaequalis (Schltdl.) Kuntze, indigenous
Dryopteris lewalleana Pic.Serm. indigenous
Dryopteris pentheri (Krasser) C.Chr. indigenous
Dryopteris pentheri (Krasser) C.Chr. var. montana (Kunze) Alston, indigenous
Dryopteris squamiseta (Hook.) Kuntze, indigenous
Elaphoglossum acrostichoides (Hook. & Grev.) Schelpe, indigenous
Elaphoglossum angustatum (Schrad.) Hieron. indigenous
Elaphoglossum aubertii (Desv.) T.Moore, indigenous
Elaphoglossum conforme (Sw.) J.Sm. indigenous
Elaphoglossum drakensbergense Schelpe, near endemic
Elaphoglossum hybridum (Bory) Brack. indigenous
Elaphoglossum macropodium (Fee) T.Moore, indigenous
Elaphoglossum petiolatum (Sw.) Urb. var. rupestre (Sim) Sim, indigenous
Elaphoglossum spathulatum (Bory) T.Moore, indigenous
Elaphoglossum spathulatum (Bory) T.Moore var. spathulatum, indigenous
Equisetum hyemale L. invasive
Equisetum ramosissimum Desf. indigenous
Equisetum ramosissimum Desf. subsp. ramosissimum, indigenous
Gleichenia polypodioides (L.) Sm. indigenous
Gleichenia umbraculifera (Kunze) T.Moore, indigenous
Grammitis poeppigiana (Mett.) Pic.Serm. indigenous
Grammitis rigescens (Bory ex Willd.) Lellinger
Histiopteris incisa (Thunb.) J.Sm. indigenous
Hymenophyllum aeruginosum (Poir.) Carmich. indigenous
Hymenophyllum capense Schrad. indigenous
Hymenophyllum capillare Desv. indigenous
Hymenophyllum capillare Desv. var. alternialatum (Pic.Serm.) Faden, indigenous
Hymenophyllum marlothii Brause, indigenous
Hymenophyllum peltatum (Poir.) Desv. indigenous
Hymenophyllum tunbridgense (L.) Sm. indigenous
Hypodematium crenatum (Forssk.) Kuhn, indigenous
Hypolepis sparsisora (Schrad.) Kuhn, indigenous
Hypolepis villosa-viscida (Thouars) Tardieu, indigenous
Lastrea athamantica (Kunze) T.Moore, indigenous
Lastrea buchananii (Baker) Bedd., indigenous
Lastrea inaequalis (Schltdl.) C.Presl, indigenous
Lastrea pentagona T.Moore, indigenous
Lastrea plantii T.Moore, indigenous
Lepisorus excavatus (Bory ex Willd.) Ching, indigenous
Lepisorus schraderi (Mett.) Ching, indigenous
Lindsaea ensifolia Sw. indigenous
Loxogramme abyssinica (Baker) M.G.Price, indigenous
Lunathyrium japonicum (Thunb.) Sa.Kurata,
Lygodium japonicum (Thunb.) Sw.
Lygodium kerstenii Kuhn,  indigenous
Lygodium microphyllum (Cav.) R.Br. indigenous
Macrothelypteris torresiana (Gaudich.) Ching
Marattia fraxinea Sm. indigenous
Marattia fraxinea Sm. var. salicifolia (Schrad.) C.Chr. indigenous
Marsilea aegyptiaca Willd. indigenous
Marsilea apposita Launert, indigenous
Marsilea burchellii (Kunze) A.Braun, indigenous
Marsilea capensis A.Braun, indigenous
Marsilea coromandelina Willd. indigenous
Marsilea ephippiocarpa Alston, indigenous
Marsilea farinosa Launert, indigenous
Marsilea farinosa Launert subsp. arrecta J.E.Burrows, indigenous
Marsilea farinosa Launert subsp. farinosa, indigenous
Marsilea fenestrata Launert, indigenous
Marsilea macrocarpa C.Presl, indigenous
Marsilea minuta L. indigenous
Marsilea minuta L. var. minuta, indigenous
Marsilea mutica Mett.
Marsilea nubica A.Braun, indigenous
Marsilea schelpeana Launert, endemic
Marsilea villifolia Bremek. & Oberm. ex Alston & Schelpe, indigenous
Megalastrum lanuginosum (Willd. ex Kaulf.) Holttum, indigenous
Melpomene flabelliformis (Poir.) A.R.Sm. & R.C.Moran, indigenous
Microgramma mauritiana (Willd.) Tardieu, indigenous
Microlepia speluncae (L.) T.Moore, indigenous
Microsorum ensiforme (Thunb.) Schelpe, indigenous
Microsorum pappei (Mett. ex Kuhn) Tardieu, indigenous
Microsorum punctatum (L.) Copel. indigenous
Microsorum scandens (G.Forst.) Tindale
Microsorum scolopendria (Burm.f.) Copel. indigenous
Mohria caffrorum (L.) Desv. endemic
Mohria caffrorum (L.) Desv. var. ferruginea J.E.Burrows & S.M.Burrows
Mohria hirsuta J.P.Roux
Mohria marginalis (Savigny) J.P.Roux, indigenous
Mohria nudiuscula J.P.Roux, indigenous
Mohria rigida J.P.Roux, indigenous
Mohria saxatilis J.P.Roux, endemic
Mohria vestita Baker, indigenous
Nephrodium antarcticum Baker, indigenous
Nephrodium athamanticum (Kunze) Hook. indigenous
Nephrodium buchananii Baker, indigenous
Nephrodium inaequale (Schltdl.) Hook. indigenous
Nephrodium squamisetum Hook. indigenous
Nephrolepis biserrata (Sw.) Schott indigenous
Nephrolepis cordifolia (L.) C.Presl
Nephrolepis cordifolia (L.) C.Presl var. cordifolia indigenous
Nothoperanema squamiseta (Hook.) Ching indigenous
Oleandra distenta Kunze, indigenous
Ophioglossum bergianum Schltdl. endemic
Ophioglossum caroticaule J.E.Burrows, indigenous
Ophioglossum convexum J.E.Burrows, indigenous
Ophioglossum costatum R.Br. indigenous
Ophioglossum gomezianum Welw. ex A.Braun, indigenous
Ophioglossum gracile Pocock ex J.E.Burrows, endemic
Ophioglossum gracillimum Welw. ex Hook. & Baker, indigenous
Ophioglossum lusoafricanum Welw. ex Prantl, indigenous
Ophioglossum nudicaule L.f. endemic
Ophioglossum polyphyllum A.Braun, indigenous
Ophioglossum polyphyllum A.Braun var. angustifolium Pocock ex J.E.Burrows, indigenous
Ophioglossum polyphyllum A.Braun var. polyphyllum, indigenous
Ophioglossum reticulatum L. indigenous
Ophioglossum rubellum Welw. ex A.Braun, indigenous
Ophioglossum vulgatum L. indigenous
Ophioglossum vulgatum L. subsp. africanum Pocock ex J.E.Burrows var. africanum, indigenous
Ophioglossum vulgatum L. subsp. kilimandscharicum (Hieron.) J.E.Burrows, indigenous
Osmunda regalis L. indigenous
Pellaea boivinii Hook. indigenous
Pellaea boivinii Hook. var. boivinii, indigenous
Pellaea calomelanos (Sw.) Link, indigenous
Pellaea calomelanos (Sw.) Link var. calomelanos, indigenous
Pellaea calomelanos (Sw.) Link var. leucomelas (Mett. ex Kuhn) J.E.Burrows, indigenous
Pellaea dura (Willd.) Hook. indigenous
Pellaea dura (Willd.) Hook. var. dura, indigenous
Pellaea leucomelas (Mett. ex Kuhn) Baker, endemic
Pellaea pectiniformis Baker, indigenous
Pellaea pteroides (L.) Prantl, endemic
Pellaea rufa A.F.Tryon, endemic
Phanerophlebia falcata (L.f.) Copel. indigenous
Phlebodium aureum (L.) J.Sm.
Phymatosorus ensiformis (Thunb.) Pic.Serm.
Phymatosorus scandens (G.Forst.) Pic.Serm.
Phymatosorus scolopendria (Burm.f.) Pic.Serm.
Pilularia bokkeveldensis N.R.Crouch, endemic
Pilularia dracomontana N.R.Crouch & J.Wesley-Smith, endemic
Pityrogramma argentea (Willd.) Domin, indigenous
Pityrogramma calomelanos (L.) Link var. aureoflava (Hook.) Weath. ex Bailey,
Platycerium bifurcatum (Cav.) C.Chr. cultivated, invasive
Pleopeltis bampsii Pic.Serm.
Pleopeltis excavata (Bory ex Willd.) Sledge
Pleopeltis macrocarpa (Bory ex Willd.) Kaulf. indigenous
Pleopeltis polypodioides (L.) E.G.Andrews & Windham subsp. ecklonii (Kunze) J.P.Roux, indigenous
Pleopeltis schraderi (Mett.) Tardieu, indigenous
Pleopeltis x simiana (Schelpe & N.C.Anthony) N.R.Crouch & Klopper subsp. simiana, indigenous
Pneumatopteris unita (Kunze) Holttum, indigenous
Polyphlebium borbonicum (Bosch) Ebihara & Dubuisson, indigenous
Polypodium aureum L. invasive
Polypodium ensiforme Thunb. endemic
Polypodium falcatum L.f.
Polypodium polypodioides (L.) Watt subsp. ecklonii (Kunze) Schelpe, indigenous
Polypodium vulgare L. indigenous
Polystichum alticola Schelpe & N.C.Anthony, indigenous
Polystichum dracomontanum Schelpe & N.C.Anthony, near endemic
Polystichum falcatum (L.f.) Diels
Polystichum inaequale (Schltdl.) Keyserl. indigenous
Polystichum incongruum J.P.Roux, endemic
Polystichum luctuosum (Kunze) T.Moore, indigenous
Polystichum macleae (Baker) Diels, indigenous
Polystichum monticola N.C.Anthony & Schelpe, indigenous
Polystichum pungens (Kaulf.) C.Presl, indigenous
Polystichum sinense (Christ) Christ, indigenous
Polystichum transkeiense W.Jacobsen, indigenous
Polystichum transvaalense N.C.Anthony, indigenous
Polystichum wilsonii Christ, indigenous
Polystichum x saltum J.P.Roux, endemic
Pseudocyclosorus pulcher (Bory ex Willd.) Holttum, indigenous
Psilotum nudum (L.) P.Beauv. indigenous
Pteridium aquilinum (L.) Kuhn, indigenous
Pteridium aquilinum (L.) Kuhn subsp. capense (Thunb.) C.Chr. indigenous
Pteris buchananii Baker ex Sim, indigenous
Pteris catoptera Kunze, indigenous
Pteris catoptera Kunze var. horridula Schelpe, indigenous
Pteris cretica L. indigenous
Pteris dentata Forssk. indigenous
Pteris friesii Hieron. indigenous
Pteris tremula R.Br. endemic
Pteris vittata L. indigenous
Ptisana fraxinea (Sm.) Murdock, indigenous
Ptisana fraxinea (Sm.) Murdock var. salicifolia (Schrad.) Murdock, indigenous
Pyrrosia africana (Kunze) F.Ballard, indigenous
Pyrrosia schimperiana (Mett. ex Kuhn) Alston, indigenous
Pyrrosia schimperiana (Mett. ex Kuhn) Alston var. schimperiana, indigenous
Rumohra adiantiformis (G.Forst.) Ching, indigenous
Salvinia minima Baker, invasiv
Salvinia molesta D.S.Mitch. invasive
Schizaea pectinata (L.) Sw. indigenous
Schizaea tenella Kaulf. indigenous
Sphaerocionium aeruginosum (Poir.) Pic.Serm. indigenous
Sphaerocionium capillare (Desv.) Copel. indigenous
Sphaeropteris cooperi (Hook. ex F.Muell.) R.M.Tryon, cultivated, invasive
Stegnogramma pozoi (Lag.) K.Iwats. indigenous
Stenochlaena tenuifolia (Desv.) T.Moore, indigenous
Sticherus umbraculiferus (Kunze) Ching, indigenous
Tectaria gemmifera (Fee) Alston, indigenous
Thelypteris altissima (Holttum) Vorster
Thelypteris bergiana (Schltdl.) Ching
Thelypteris chaseana Schelpe
Thelypteris confluens (Thunb.) C.V.Morton, indigenous
Thelypteris dentata (Forssk.) E.P.St.John
Thelypteris gueinziana (Mett.) Schelpe
Thelypteris interrupta (Willd.) K.Iwats
Thelypteris knysnaensis N.C.Anthony & Schelpe
Thelypteris madagascariensis (Fee) Schelpe
Thelypteris oppositiformis (C.Chr.) Ching
Thelypteris pozoi (Lag.) C.V.Morton
Thelypteris pulchra (Bory ex Willd.) Schelpe
Todea barbara (L.) T.Moore, indigenous
Trichomanes borbonicum Bosch
Trichomanes dregei Bosch, indigenous
Trichomanes erosum Willd. var. aerugineum (Bosch) C.Chr. ex Bonap. indigenous
Trichomanes inopinatum (Pic.Serm.) J.E.Burrows
Trichomanes melanotrichum Schltdl.
Trichomanes reptans Sw. indigenous
Vittaria isoetifolia Bory, indigenous
Woodsia angolensis Schelpe, indigenous
Woodsia burgessiana Gerrard ex Hook. & Baker, indigenous
Woodsia montevidensis (Spreng.) Hieron. var. burgessiana (Gerrard ex Hook. & Baker) Schelpe,

See also

References

South African plant biodiversity lists
Ferns